Seyyedlar (also known as Sar Lar, Sarlaro, and Seyyedlar-e Dalīkānlū) is a village in Garmeh-ye Shomali Rural District, Kandovan District, Meyaneh County, East Azerbaijan Province, Iran. At the 2006 census, its population was 139, in 34 families.

References 

Populated places in Meyaneh County